Dorssaf Gharssi is a Tunisian freestyle wrestler. She is a five-time medalist at the African Wrestling Championships. Her best result was the silver medal at the 2020 African Wrestling Championships held in Algiers, Algeria.

Achievements

References

External links 
 

Living people
Year of birth missing (living people)
Place of birth missing (living people)
Tunisian female sport wrestlers
African Wrestling Championships medalists
21st-century Tunisian women